Martin Gerretsen Schuneman (February 10, 1764 – February 21, 1827) was a United States representative from New York.

Born in Catskill, he was educated by his father, a clergyman.  Town histories recount that Schuneman was well known in upstate New York because of his imposing physique; he was six feet three inches tall, and weighed nearly 300 pounds.

In 1792 he was appointed a  justice of the peace for Albany County, which then included Catskill. He operated a successful general store, and owned an inn in Madison, now called Leeds, as well as gristmills and other business ventures.

He was Catskill's Town Supervisor in 1797, 1799, and 1802.  He was a member of the New York State Assembly in 1798 to 1800 when Catskill was part of Ulster County.  He was a delegate from newly formed Greene County to the State constitutional convention in 1801, and represented a Greene County district in the Assembly in 1802.

In 1804 he was elected as a Democratic-Republican to the Ninth Congress, holding office from March 4, 1805, to March 3, 1807.

He resumed his former business pursuits and died in Catskill on February 21, 1827.  He was buried at the Old Cemetery in Leeds.

References

1764 births
1827 deaths
American people of Dutch descent
People from Catskill, New York
Town supervisors in New York (state)
New York (state) state court judges
Members of the New York State Assembly
Democratic-Republican Party members of the United States House of Representatives from New York (state)
Burials in New York (state)